The 2002 Irish general election to the 29th Dáil was held on Friday, 17 May, just over three weeks after the dissolution of the 28th Dáil on Thursday, 25 April by President Mary McAleese, at the request of the Taoiseach, Bertie Ahern. The general election took place in 42 Dáil constituencies throughout Ireland for 166 seats in Dáil Éireann, the house of representatives of the Oireachtas, with a revision of constituencies since the last election under the Electoral (Amendment) (No. 2) Act 1998.

The 29th Dáil met at Leinster House on Thursday, 6 June to nominate the Taoiseach for appointment by the president and to approve the appointment of a new government of Ireland. Bertie Ahern was re-appointed Taoiseach, forming the 26th Government of Ireland, a majority coalition government of Fianna Fáil and the Progressive Democrats.

Overview

The general election was significant for a number of reasons:

The election was considered a success for Fianna Fáil, with the party coming within a handful of seats from achieving an overall majority (the nearest the country came to a single-party government since 1987). The only high-profile loss was cabinet minister Mary O'Rourke losing her seat in Westmeath.
The re-election of the Fianna Fáil–Progressive Democrats government, the first occasion since 1969 that an Irish government won re-election.
The meltdown in Fine Gael support, which saw the main opposition party drop from 54 to 31 seats, and lose all but three seats in Dublin.
The failure of the Labour Party, contrary to all expectations, to increase its seat total. Later in the year, Ruairi Quinn stepped down as leader of the Labour Party. He was replaced by Pat Rabbitte, who was one of four Democratic Left TDs who joined in a merger with Labour in 1999. The most high-profile loss for the party was the defeat of former leader Dick Spring in Kerry.
The success of the Green Party, which increased its TDs from two to six, including its first Teachta Dála (TD) outside of Dublin.
The electoral success of Sinn Féin, which increased its seat number from one to five.
The election of a large number of independent candidates.
Contrary to what opinion polls and political pundits were predicting, the Progressive Democrats kept all of their seats, and picked up four more.
It was the first time electronic voting machines were used in an Irish election. They were used in three constituencies: Dublin North, Dublin West and Meath. They would not be used again at a general election.

Fine Gael
The most noticeable feature of the election was the collapse in Fine Gael's vote. It suffered its second worst electoral result ever (after the 1948 general election), with several prominent members failing to get re-elected, including:
Alan Dukes – former party leader
Jim Mitchell – deputy leader
Nora Owen – former deputy leader and former Minister for Justice
Austin Currie – former presidential candidate
Jim Higgins – former Chief Whip
Alan Shatter – front bench member
Deirdre Clune – front bench member
Michael Creed – front bench member
Frances Fitzgerald – front bench member

The party's losses were especially pronounced in Dublin, where just three TDs (Richard Bruton, Gay Mitchell and Olivia Mitchell) were returned, fewer than Fianna Fáil, Labour, the Progressive Democrats or the Greens.
The reasons for the drop in support for Fine Gael are many and varied:
There was an element of bad luck in some losses, and the proportion of seats they lost (42.6%) was much greater than the proportion of votes (25.2%).
In 2002, the Irish economy was booming, unemployment was low, and the outgoing government was a stable one that had lasted its full term.
No other opposition party, noticeably Labour, would agree to a pre-election pact with Fine Gael, sensing the unpopularity of the party. This meant that no-one felt that Fine Gael would be able to lead a government after the election. In contrast, the two parties of the outgoing government fought the election on a united front.
The Fine Gael party was poorly organised in Dublin, and morale was low.
The political landscape had changed in Ireland since Fine Gael's heyday in the 1980s. The Progressive Democrats and the Green Party in particular ate into Fine Gael's middle class support, and anti-Fianna Fáil voters had a much wider range of parties to choose from. All 4 of the extra seats won by the Green Party were at the expense of Fine Gael, as were 3 out of 4 of the Progressive Democrats' gains.
Toward the end of the campaign, Michael McDowell warned that because Fianna Fáil were so high in the opinion polls, they could form a government by themselves. This led to a significant shift to the Progressive Democrats at the last minute, and many Fine Gael voters voted strategically for the Progressive Democrats to avoid a single-party Fianna Fáil government.

In the immediate aftermath of the election, Fine Gael leader Michael Noonan announced his resignation from the leadership and Enda Kenny was chosen as the new leader in the subsequent election.

Results

Independents include Independent Health Alliance candidates (12,296 votes, 1 seat) and Independent Fianna Fáil (6,124 votes, 1 seat).

Voting summary

Seats summary

Government formation
Fianna Fáil and the Progressive Democrats formed 26th Government of Ireland, a majority coalition government.  it is the only coalition government in Irish politics to have been returned after a general election.

Dáil membership changes
The following changes took place as a result of the election:
22 outgoing TDs retired
143 TDs stood for re-election (plus the Ceann Comhairle, Séamus Pattison who was automatically returned)
110 of those were re-elected
33 failed to be re-elected
55 successor TDs were elected
47 were elected for the first time
8 had previously been TDs
There were 7 successor female TDs, replacing 6 outgoing, increasing the total number by 1 to 22
There were changes in 38 of 42 constituencies contested

Outgoing TDs are listed in the constituency they contested in the election. For some, such as Marian McGennis, this differs from the constituency they represented in the outgoing Dáil. Where more than one change took place in a constituency the concept of successor is an approximation for presentation only.

The cross-party seat transfers are summarized thus:

See also
Members of the 22nd Seanad

Footnotes

References

Further reading

External links
RTÉ archives
Archived collection of party manifestos from 2002 on IrishManifestos.co.nr

General
General
2002
29th Dáil
May 2002 events in Europe